The Mangalore Dasara (Tulu: Marnemi, Konkani: Mannami), is a festival in the Indian city of Mangalore organized by  Acharya Mutt]]. It is also referred as Navarathri Festival, Vijayadashami. The tiger dance, lion dance and bear dance are the main attractions. The city is decorated with lights for the span of 10 days of the occasion. People decorate their houses and businesses, shops, hotels, etc. Most of the roads in Mangalore such as M.G Road, K.S Rao Road, Carstreet, GHS Road are seen garnished with lights and electric lanterns for the procession. The image of Mangalore City Corporation building decorated with colorful and bright lights makes for a spectacular viewing.

The hundred year anniversary celebration in 2012 was the center of attraction during the Navrathri festival. Navrathri and Shivarathri are the two big festivals celebrated at Gokarnanatheshwara Temple. Mangalore Dasara was started by B.R.Karkera.

Pilinalike 
Royal Pilinalike (Tulu: Pili Yesa, Kannada: Hulivesha) is a folk dance performed during Dasara. Typically young males form troops of five to ten. They are painted and costumed like tigers and use a band with two or three drummers. The band called thaase in Tulu. This troop is accompanied by the manager of the group. These troops will be roaming the streets of their towns, with the accompanying drum beats of their bands. They stop at homes and businesses or on the roadsides to perform for about ten minutes after which they collect some money from the people who have observed their performance. The Pilinalike is performed to honor the goddess Sharada, whose favoured animal is the tiger.

Dasara idols in Gokarnanatheshwara Temple 
During Navaratri various idols along with Sharada Devi will be installed by the priests at Swarna Kalamantapa amidst the chanting of hymns and performance of Vedic rituals.[2] In these nine days of celebrations, the decorated idols of Sharada Devi along with Mahaganapati and Navadurgas will be worshipped.
 Sharada Devi
 Mahaganapati
 Adi Shakti
 Navadurgas
 Shailaputri
 Brahmacharini
 Chandraghanta
 Kushmandaini
 Skandamata
 Katyayini
 Kaalratri
 Mahagauri
 Siddhidatri 
The Kudroli temple trust keeps the `Gangavatharana’ (Ganges water flowing from the crown of Shiva) in operation for all 9 days during the Navratri. The depiction has 4 colorful idols of Shiva 13 feet high with a water jet to rush towards the sky reaching 100 feet. As the water from four sides reach their pinnacle they take the shape of a Shivalingam.

The Grand Procession 

The procession begins from the Kudroli Shree Gokarnanatheshwara Temple in the evening of Vijaya Dashami and will end at the same venue early morning Next day with the immersion of the idols at the Pushkarini pond inside the temple complex. Idols of ‘Navadurgas’ along with Mahaganapathi and Sharada are carried in the procession, augmented by flowers, decorative umbrellas, tableaux, bands, chende and traditional dances, folk dances, Yakshagana characters, Dollu Kunitha, gombe (dolls), Pilinalike (Huli vesha) and other traditional art forms. The procession passes through the main roads of the city including Kudroli, Mannagudda, Ladyhill, Lalbagh, K S Rao road, Hampanakatta, Car Street and Alake.

Other locations 
Though primary location of Mangalore Dasara is Kudroli Shri Gokarnanatheshwara Temple, Mangalore Dasara can also be referred to as the group of celebrations/events organized by temples such as Mangaladevi, Sri Venkatramana Temple, Sri Jodumutt etc.
There are various Sharada Pooja committees which organise Sharada Pooja's. Few of them are Sarvajanika Shree Sharada Pooja Mahotsava Acharya Mutt, Brahma Vidya Prabodhini Shree Sharada Pooja Mahotsava Jodumutt, Rathabeedi Balakara Sharada Mahotsava Gokarna Mutt, Tank Colony Sharada Mahotsava, V.T.Road Balakara Vrinda, Shri Sharada Yuvaka Vrinda Dongerkeri etc

Mangaladevi Dasara  

Mangaladevi, Bolar attracts devotees all over India to celebrate the Dasara festival. Mangalore got its name from Mangaladevi. Mangaladevi temple arranges cultural programmes such as folk, music, drama, plays on various themes, ballets and devotional songs. On the ninth day, known as mahanavami, devotees participate in the Rathotsava (car festival). The decorated goddess is mounted on the grand chariot and pulled with thick ropes. The Rathothsava is filled with various deities and many tableaux decorated with colorful lights. The procession reaches Marnamikatta where the goddess is worshipped.

Mangalore Sharadotsava 
Popularly known as "Mangalore Sharadotsava" or "Sharada Mahotsava" is a 6-7 days celebration during the Navaratri in Sri Venkatramana Temple, Car Street. Idol of Goddess Sharada is installed at Acharya Mutt premises of Sri Venkataramana Temple, Car Street. The idol is earlier brought to the Mutt premises in a grand procession from "The Great Darbar Beedi Works", Bunder. The festivities will conclude with a colourful and grand procession carrying the idol of Goddess Sharada would be taken out on the main streets of the city where thousands of people gather on either sides of the streets to witness the  procession. The idol will be immersed at the Mahamaya Temple lake during the wee hours upon the culmination of the procession.

Brahma Vidya Prabodhini Jodumutt 
Brahma Vidya Prabodhini Shree Sharada Pooja Mahotsava, is a 6-7 days celebration during the Navaratri in Jodumutt Street, Mangalore.
Idol of Goddess Sharada is installed at Jodumutt premises and pooja will be held from Moola nakshatra to Shravana Nakshatra. Various alankars are performed on every pooja day. Shobhayatra will be held on Ekadashi day of Navaratri which concludes with idol immersion at Mahamaya Tank.

References

External links
Mangalore Dasara website

Hindu festivals
Religious festivals in India
Dance festivals in India
Culture of Mangalore
Tourist attractions in Mangalore